The East German Republic Day Parade of 1974 was a military parade of the National People's Army on Karl-Marx-Allee in East Berlin on 7 October 1974, the GDR's Republic Day, commemorating the 25th anniversary of the establishment of East Germany. This parade was held in the presence of Soviet Leader Leonid Brezhnev.

Gallery

See also 

25 Jahre DDR - Ehrenparade der NVA - 1974
Nationale Volksarmee parade rehearsal 1974
Public holidays in Germany

References 

Military parades in East Germany
1974 in East Germany
October 1974 events in Europe